Carl Bryan Villegas Cruz (born August 21, 1991), also known by his initials CBC, is a Filipino professional basketball player for the TNT Tropang Giga of the Philippine Basketball Association (PBA).

Professional career
Cruz was selected in the special draft of the 2016 PBA draft by the Alaska Aces.

On September 6, 2019, he was traded to the Blackwater Elite for Abu Tratter.

On December 3, 2021, he was traded to the TNT Tropang Giga for Jay Washington and two future second-round picks. He signed a one-year extension with the team on January 26, 2022.

PBA career statistics

As of the end of 2021 season

Season-by-season averages

|-
| align=left | 
| align=left | Alaska
| 23 || 12.7 || .350 || .286 || .655 || 3.4 || .4 || .4 || .0 || 4.5
|-
| align=left | 
| align=left | Alaska
| 27 || 12.4 || .385 || .316 || .714 || 2.8 || .4 || .3 || .2 || 4.1
|-
| align=left rowspan=2| 
| align=left | Alaska
| rowspan=2|37 || rowspan=2|20.6 || rowspan=2|.354 || rowspan=2|.333 || rowspan=2|.804 || rowspan=2|3.6 || rowspan=2|.8 || rowspan=2|.2 || rowspan=2|.3 || rowspan=2|8.1
|-
| Blackwater
|-
| align=left rowspan=2| 
| align=left | Blackwater
| rowspan=2|10 || rowspan=2|19.5 || rowspan=2|.365 || rowspan=2|.349 || rowspan=2|.700 || rowspan=2|2.0 || rowspan=2|.6 || rowspan=2|.3 || rowspan=2|.2 || rowspan=2|6.0
|-
| align=left | TNT
|-
|-class=sortbottom
| align="center" colspan=2 | Career
| 97 || 16.3 || .360 || .326 || .743 || 3.2 || .6 || .3 || .2 || 5.9

References

1991 births
Living people
Alaska Aces (PBA) draft picks
Alaska Aces (PBA) players
Basketball players from Manila
Blackwater Bossing players
Competitors at the 2017 Southeast Asian Games
FEU Tamaraws basketball players
Filipino men's basketball players
Philippine Basketball Association All-Stars
Philippines men's national basketball team players
Power forwards (basketball)
Southeast Asian Games gold medalists for the Philippines
Southeast Asian Games medalists in basketball